1833 Naval Air Squadron (1833 NAS) was a Naval Air Squadron of the Royal Navy's Fleet Air Arm between 1943 and 1945 and then again from 1947 to 1957.

First creation

The squadron was first formed on 15 July 1943 at the US Naval Air Station at US Naval Air Station Quonset Point, Rhode Island under the command of Lt Cdr (A) H A Monk and with a complement of 10 aircraft. Equipped with the American Chance Vought F4U-1 known as the Corsair I in British service the squadron moved to the US Naval Air Station Brunswick, Maine in August 1943 before shipping back to the United Kingdom in October 1943 on board the escort carrier . While at Brunswick the squadron was re-equipped with an upgraded version of the Corsair, the F4U-1D or Corsair II. The squadron formed part of 15 Naval Fighter Wing under the command of Lt Cdr R J Cork succeeded upon Cork's death in March 1944 by Lt Cdr A M Tritton, the other squadrons being 1830 Squadron and 1831 Squadron. In December 1943 the decision was made to increase the complement of squadrons to 14 aircraft and to achieve this 1831 Squadron was disbanded with its pilots being distributed to the other two squadrons. On 30 December 1943 Illustrious sailed for the Indian Ocean to join the British Pacific Fleet.

In March 1944 Lt Cdr Monk was posted away and replaced as commanding officer by Lt Cdr N S Hanson RNVR. From May 1944 the squadron took part in several operations including Operation Cockpit, Operation Transom, Operation Crimson, Operation Robson, Operation Outflank, Operation Meridian and Operation Iceberg.  In August 1944 the size of the squadron was enlarged again, to 18, with 1838 Squadron from  being disbanded to provide the additional personnel and aircraft.

During Operation Iceberg, Illustrious was damaged by a Japanese Kamikaze attack and the damage sustained resulted in Illustrious being withdrawn from combat operation in May 1945. The personal of the two fighter squadrons were retained on-board, although the aircraft were disembarked in Australia, until the ship returned to the UK in June 1945. The following month both squadrons were disbanded.

The squadron was awarded three battle honours; Okinawa 1945, Palemberg 1945 and Sapeng 1944.

Second creation

In 1947 the squadron was reformed at HMS Gamecock near Bramcote, Warwickshire  as one of the first four units of the RNVR Air Branch.  Initially equipped with piston-engined aircraft such as the Supermarine Seafire and the Hawker Sea Fury, latterly the squadron was equipped with jet aircraft, the de Havilland Sea Vampire and the Supermarine Attacker.  The move to jet aircraft required the squadron to move to RAF Honiley, close to Bramcote, as the facilities at Bramcote were unsuitable for jet aircraft.  The squadron was disbanded in March 1957 along with the rest of the RNVR Air Branch.

References

Sources

Further reading
  Hanson was the second wartime CO of the squadron and wrote his autobiography of his war time experiences.

External links

 

1800 series Fleet Air Arm squadrons
Military units and formations established in 1943
Military units and formations of the Royal Navy in World War II